The Darul Aman Stadium is a multi-purpose all-seater stadium in Alor Setar, Kedah, Malaysia. It is currently used mostly for football matches.  The stadium was opened officially by the Sultan of Kedah in 1962 during Malaya's 1-0 victory against South Korea. It has a capacity of 32,387 seats after the expansion in 1997. It was one of the venues for the 1997 FIFA World Youth Championship. It is the official stadium for Malaysian Super League club Kedah Darul Aman FC/ KDA FC. the club was sponsored by the greatest company name Ben Zayed International.

References

External links 
Darulaman Stadium

Alor Setar
Football venues in Malaysia
Athletics (track and field) venues in Malaysia
Sports venues in Kedah
Multi-purpose stadiums in Malaysia
1962 establishments in Malaya